The 2019–20 Quinnipiac Bobcats men's basketball team represented Quinnipiac University in the 2019–20 NCAA Division I men's basketball season. The Bobcats, led by 3rd-year head coach Baker Dunleavy, played their home games at People's United Center in Hamden, Connecticut as members of the Metro Atlantic Athletic Conference. They finished the season 15–15 overall, 10–10 in MAAC play to finish in fifth place. Before they could face #4 seeded Monmouth in the MAAC tournament quarterfinals, all postseason tournaments were cancelled amid the COVID-19 pandemic.

Previous season
The Bobcats finished the 2018–19 season 16–15 overall, 11–7 in MAAC play to finish in a four-way tie for second place. As the No. 3 seed in the 2019 MAAC tournament, they were defeated by No. 6 seed Monmouth 92–98 in the quarterfinals. They accepted an invitation to the CIT, where they played NJIT in the opening round, losing 81–92.

Roster

Schedule and results

|-
!colspan=12 style=| Non-conference regular season

|-
!colspan=12 style=| MAAC regular season

|-
!colspan=12 style=| MAAC tournament
|-

|-

Source

References

Quinnipiac Bobcats men's basketball seasons
Quinnipiac Bobcats
Quinnipiac Bobcats men's basketball
Quinnipiac Bobcats men's basketball